The octagonal Jubilee Tower (officially called Darwen Tower) at grid reference SD678215 on Darwen Hill overlooking the town of Darwen in Lancashire, England, was completed in 1898 to commemorate Queen Victoria's Diamond Jubilee and also to celebrate the victory of the local people for the right to access the moor. It was opened to the public on 24 September 1898. The architect was R. W. Smith-Saville and he modified the plans for the tower slightly.

Walkers can climb to the top of the tower via the internal staircase to see views of North Yorkshire, Morecambe Bay, Blackpool Tower, Cumbria, the Isle of Man, North Wales, Derbyshire, elsewhere in Lancashire, and surrounding moorland.

Background
Packmen, peddlers, farmers and labourers used tracks and moorland paths to go about their business. In the 1870s the Lord of the manor of Over Darwen, the Reverend William Arthur Duckworth, blocked ancient rights of way preventing access to the moor even though he was an absentee landlord. Game rights were a valuable commodity and Duckworth did not wish to have his land devalued by trespassers on the moors. William Thomas Ashton, manager of Eccles Shorrock's mines at Dogshaw Clough and Entwistle Moss used the moorland footpaths as well to deliver coal to farmers and other customers. Whenever Duckworth's gamekeepers blocked his way Ashton cleared the paths. The struggle led to the courts where Duckworth lost and in September 1896 people resumed walking the moorland footpaths and, as Ashton died in 1884, his sons led a procession onto the moors in celebration.

Architecture

There is a stone spiral staircase to the first level and slightly above, followed by a smaller metal spiral staircase which leads to the very top. Wind speeds can be very high at the top of the tower, and often mist below will obscure the surrounding views. In 1947 the original wooden turret built by a crew including apprentice Ernest Brooks of Darwen (who later built the Lych Gate at Sunnyhurst Wood) on top of the tower was blown off in a gale and was not replaced until 1971 when the tower was crowned once again with a fibreglass dome paid for mainly by fund-raising by local people. The tower was closed to the public for 19 months due to being deemed unsafe for use. The tower was closed to the public in October 2000 to investigate whether the tower was unsafe for the public, and a survey in spring 2001 found that the structure had severe decay in the stone decking. The refurbishment was supposed to take 2–3 months but after delays the tower was re-opened on 9 April 2002.

The tower dome came off during strong winds on 11 November 2010. A replacement powder-coated stainless steel dome made by WEC Group of Darwen, which cost more than £35,000, was winched into place by helicopter on 13 January 2012.
Further restoration was planned for 2021, starting in July and finished in time for the Queen's platinum jubilee in June 2022.

References

External links

 History of the Tower
 BBC History Article

Buildings and structures in Blackburn with Darwen
West Pennine Moors
Monuments and memorials in Lancashire
Towers in Lancashire
Darwen
Grade II listed buildings in Lancashire